These are the official results of the women's 100 metres hurdles at the 1992 Summer Olympics in Barcelona, Spain.

Despite the presence of the world record holder Yordanka Donkova (who had her career peak four years earlier), Gail Devers came into this race as the favorite.  Though her Olympic history shows her winning the 100 metres twice, the first time earlier in this Olympics, she primarily made her career as a hurdler.  And true to form, Devers had a commanding lead in this race, until the final hurdle.  Devers came up short and hit the hurdle, foot first, hard, knocking her off balance.  She stumbled toward the finish line, falling on the last step, but still finished fifth, .001 out of fourth place.  Voula Patoulidou was the gold medalist, followed by LaVonna Martin and Donkova.

Medalists

Records
These were the standing world and Olympic records (in seconds) prior to the 1992 Summer Olympics.

Final
Wind: +0.4m/s

Semi finals
Heat 1.
Wind: -1.9m/s

Heat 2.
Wind: +0.0m/s

Quarterfinals
Heat 1. Wind: -1.5m/s

Heat 2. Wind: +1.4m/s

Heat 3. Wind: -0.7m/s

Heats
Heat 1. Wind: -1.5m/s

Heat 2. Wind: +0.0m/s

Heat 3. Wind: -0.4m/s

Heat 4. Wind: +0.0m/s

Heat 5. Wind: -0.7m/s

See also
 1986 European World Championships 100m Hurdles (Stuttgart)
 1987 Women's World Championships 100m Hurdles (Rome)
 1988 Women's Olympic 100m Hurdles (Seoul)
 1990 European World Championships 100m Hurdles (Split)
 1991 Women's World Championships 100m Hurdles (Tokyo)
 1993 Women's World Championships 100m Hurdles (Stuttgart)
 1994 European World Championships 100m Hurdles (Helsinki)

References

External links
 Official Report
 Results

H
Sprint hurdles at the Olympics
1992 in women's athletics
Women's events at the 1992 Summer Olympics